"Love Song of the Waterfall" is a song written by Bob Nolan. It was sung by Roy Rogers with the band Sons of the Pioneers, that Bob Nolan was a founding member of.

Slim Whitman version 

This became Slim Whitman's first hit for the Imperial record label in 1952. (Prior to that, he was with RCA Victor.) He recorded it, along with "My Love Is Growing Stale", "Bandera Waltz", and "End of the World", in November 1951 at KWKH.

"Love Song of the Waterfall" was released as a single (Imperial 8134, with "My Love Is Growing Stale" on the opposite side) in January 1952 and by the end of April showed up just under the top ten of the Billboard Country & Western Records Most Played by Folk Disk Jockeys chart.

On the record's label, Slim Whitman was subtitled as "The Smilin' Star Duster".

Track listing

Charts

Jimmy Wakely version 

After Slim Whitman, another rendition of the song was released by Jimmy Wakely with the Les Baxter Orchestra (Capitol 2028, c/w "Goodbye, Little Girl"). "The type of lyric Wakely handles best," wrote Daily Variety.

References 

1930s songs
1952 singles
Imperial Records singles
Slim Whitman songs
Jimmy Wakely songs
Songs written by Bob Nolan